The Philadelphia White Stockings played in 1875 as a member of the National Association of Professional Base Ball Players. The press of that time generally referred to them as the Philadelphia Whites, or the Philadelphia Club.  The team finished fifth in the league in 1875, with a record of 37-31. Among their players that season was Tim Murnane, spelled "Murnan" by many newspapers (for example, "...yesterday the Whites won the toss and placed their men in position, with the Philadelphias represented by Murnan at the bat."  ("Sporting News," Chicago Inter Ocean, June 23, 1875, p. 5). The team and league folded at the conclusion of the season.

Regular season

Season standings

Record vs. opponents

Roster

Player stats

Batting
Note: G = Games played; AB = At bats; H = Hits; Avg. = Batting average; HR = Home runs; RBI = Runs batted in

Starting pitchers 
Note: G = Games pitched; IP = Innings pitched; W = Wins; L = Losses; ERA = Earned run average; SO = Strikeouts

Relief pitchers 
Note: G = Games pitched; W = Wins; L = Losses; SV = Saves; ERA = Earned run average; SO = Strikeouts

References
1875 Philadelphia Whites season at Baseball Reference

Philadelphia White Stockings seasons
Philadelphia White Stockings Season, 1875
Philly